The Ku Ikaika Challenge is an annual big-wave competition, held at Makaha Beach, in Mākaha, Hawaii, on the island of Oahu. The 1st Annual Challenge was held on February 14, 2008, in surf between 15 and 25 feet. Aaron Napoleon won the contest. Many surfers come and compete to show off their skills on the waves. The winner for first place receives $4,000. This challenge is mainly sponsored by Quick Silver. The challenge itself is a one-day event.

1st Annual Ku Ikaika: Famous Competitors

Brian Keaulana helped organize the event. Bonga Perkins, Jamie Sterling, Garrett McNamara, Raimana Van Bastolaer, Buzzy Kerbox, Chris Mauro, and Kainoa McGee were some of the better-known competitors in the 2008 event. The picture to the right is of Makaha Beach.

References

External links

Big wave surfing
Surfing competitions in Hawaii
Surfing in Hawaii
Annual events in Hawaii
Recurring sporting events established in 2008
2008 establishments in Hawaii